Idarubicin  or 4-demethoxydaunorubicin is an anthracycline antileukemic drug. It inserts itself into DNA and prevents DNA unwinding by interfering with the enzyme topoisomerase II. It is an analog of daunorubicin, but the absence of a methoxy group increases its fat solubility and cellular uptake.
Similar to other anthracyclines, it also induces histone eviction from chromatin.

It belongs to the family of drugs called antitumor antibiotics.

It is currently combined with cytosine arabinoside as a first line treatment of acute myeloid leukemia.

It is used for treatment of acute lymphoblastic leukemia and chronic myelogenous leukemia in blast crisis.

It is distributed under the trade names Zavedos (UK) and Idamycin (USA).

Side effects 
Diarrhea, stomach cramps, nausea and vomiting are common among patients treated with idarubicin.

References

External links 
 Idarubicin bound to proteins in the PDB

Anthracyclines
Topoisomerase inhibitors